Short Mountain Wildlife Management Area is located on   south of Augusta off Augusta-Ford Hill Road (County Route 7) in Hampshire County, West Virginia. Short Mountain WMA is owned by the West Virginia Division of Natural Resources.

Short Mountain WMA lies between the two mountain ridges of Short Mountain that form a long horseshoe-shaped basin with Meadow Run flowing through its center. Almost all of the WMA is covered in mixed oak and Virginia pine. Hunting is available for wild turkey, deer, squirrel, and ruffed grouse. Six primitive camping areas are distributed around the area. A nominal camping fee is charged by the WVDNR.

Short Mountain WMA is also popular with bird watchers for its wetland species and late spring breeders.

See also
Animal conservation
Fishing
Hunting
List of West Virginia wildlife management areas

References

External links
West Virginia DNR District 2 Wildlife Management Areas
West Virginia Hunting Regulations
West Virginia Fishing Regulations
WVDNR map of Short Mountain Wildlife Management Area

Campgrounds in West Virginia
Protected areas of Hampshire County, West Virginia
Wildlife management areas of West Virginia
IUCN Category V